Turrialba is a canton in the Cartago province of Costa Rica. The head city is in Turrialba district.

History 
Turrialba was created on 19 August 1903 by decree 84.

Geography 
Turrialba has an area of  km² and a mean elevation of  metres.

Turrialba is the eleventh largest canton among the eighty two cantons that comprise Costa Rica. The Turrialba River and Atirro River establish major portions of the canton's western border, and the Chirripó River delineates its long southeastern border.  The region is home to the active Turrialba Volcano.

Districts 
The canton of Turrialba is subdivided into the following districts:
 Turrialba
 La Suiza
 Peralta
 Santa Cruz
 Santa Teresita
 Pavones
 Tuis
 Tayutic
 Santa Rosa
 Tres Equis
 La Isabel
 Chirripó

Demographics 

For the 2011 census, Turrialba had a population of  inhabitants.

Transportation

Road transportation 
The canton is covered by the following road routes:

Economy

Tourism
Guayabo National Monument is a historic archaeological site located 18 km north of Turrialba city, it is located in the Santa Teresita and Santa Cruz districts of the canton.  It is one of Costa Rica's only two pre-Columbian sites that is open to the public, together with the Stone Spheres Museum in the south of the country.

The Turrialba Volcano National Park is located in the canton, reopened after it was closed from 2012 to 2020 due to eruptions.

Dairy farms 
The eponymous Turrialba cheese is produced in this region.

References 

Cantons of Cartago Province
Populated places in Cartago Province